Parliamentary elections were held in Chile on 3 March 1957. The Radical Party emerged as the largest party in the Chamber of Deputies, winning 36 of the 147 seats.

Results

References

Elections in Chile
Chile
Parliamentary
Chile
Election and referendum articles with incomplete results